The Hochstein School (formerly Hochstein School of Music & Dance) is an all ages school of music and dance in Rochester, New York The school was founded in 1920.

History
David Hochstein was a world-renowned violinist from Rochester. When he was killed in World War I's Battle of Argonne in October 1918, elites such as George Eastman and Emily Sibley Watson joined with other citizens of Rochester in forming the "David Hochstein Music School Settlement". The school was chartered by the State of New York in 1920.

In 1976, Hochstein became the first non-degree granting school to be accredited by the National Association of Schools of Music.

Facilities
The school was originally opened in the Hochstein's family home on Joseph Avenue for 250 students. By 1928, the school had begun to outgrow this facility. Funds are raised by interested citizens for a new site to be constructed on 12 Hoeltzer Street.  The school remained here until 1975, when in need of more space, it is moved to the former Central Presbyterian Church on Plymouth Avenue. In 1978, the building was purchased for $1, "considered to be an appropriate fee in light of the long tradition of the importance of music in that house of worship."

Hochstein's Performance Hall is the former sanctuary of the Central Presbyterian Church and has been fully renovated as a theater. It hosts student performances as well as concerts from outside groups. Once a week, live concerts are broadcast from the Performance Hall as part of WXXI-FM's "Live from Hochstein" concert series.

References

External links

1920 establishments in New York (state)
Dance in New York (state)
Dance schools in the United States
Education in Rochester, New York
Educational institutions established in 1920
Music of Rochester, New York
Music schools in New York (state)